Frans Pretorius (born 31 July 1973) is a South African and Canadian physicist, specializing in computer simulations in astrophysics and numerical solutions of Einstein's field equations. He is professor of physics at Princeton University and director of the Princeton Gravity Initiative.

Biography
Pretorius sat for a B.Sc. in computer engineering in 1996 and an M.Sc. in physics in 1999 for his thesis, entitled Topics in Black Hole Physics under Werner Israel, at the University of Victoria. He defended his Ph.D. in 2002 under Matthew Choptuik at the University of British Columbia. For his doctoral dissertation on numerical simulation of gravitational collapse, Pretorius received the 2003 Nicholas Metropolis Award of the American Physical Society. From 2002 to 2005 he was a Richard Chase Tolman Fellow at the California Institute of Technology. He then became an assistant professor in 2005 at the University of Alberta and in 2007 at Princeton University.

Research
His research deals with numerical simulations in general relativity theory, especially gravitational collapse, collision, and mergers of black holes and consequent emission of gravitational waves. He has developed new methods of adaptive meshes, which are used in adaptive mesh refinement for coupled elliptic-hyperbolic systems.

Pretorius has numerically investigated the possibilities and the signatures of small black holes in particle colliders such as the LHC. Small black holes might be formed with very high collision energies, the energy required might be a factor 2.3 smaller than previously assumed, but such high energies are extremely far from the capabilities of the LHC. With Abhay Ashtekar and Fethi Ramazanoğlu, he investigated the evaporation of 2D black holes. Pretorius and his collaborators numerically investigated the high energy collision of two black holes.

Awards and honors
Pretorius was a Sloan Fellow in 2010 and received in 2010 the Aneesur Rahman Prize for Computational Physics. In 2011 he was elected a Fellow of the American Physical Society. In 2017 he was awarded the New Horizons in Physics Prize for the development of the first computer code that can simulate the spiral movement and the fusion of two black holes; in 2017 five other physicists in two different groups shared the prize for work done independently of Pretorius. In 2021 he received the Dirac Medal of the ICTP.

Selected publications

References

External links
Frans Pretorius, homepage at Department of Physics, Princeton University
Frans Pretorius – Black hole probes of the cosmos and fundamental physics, YouTube, 4 March 2013

1973 births
Living people
University of Victoria alumni
University of British Columbia
Princeton University faculty
Canadian astrophysicists
Computational physicists
Fellows of the American Physical Society
Sloan Research Fellows